Burn the Ships (stylized as burn the ships) is the third studio album by For King & Country, an Australian Christian pop duo comprising brothers Luke Smallbone and Joel Smallbone, released via Word Entertainment on 5 October 2018. It features appearances from Moriah Peters and Courtney, the respective wives of Joel and Luke Smallbone. For King & Country collaborated with Matt Hales, Blake Kanicka, Seth Mosley and Tedd Tjornhom in the production of the album.

Burn the Ships was supported by the release of four singles, "Joy," "God Only Knows," "Burn the Ships," and "Amen". The singles "Joy" and "God Only Knows" were certified gold, "God Only Knows" was also certified platinum in the United States by RIAA. The album was also marketed by two tours, Burn the Ships  Album Release Tour and Burn the Ships  World Tour. The album was a commercial success as it became For King & Country's highest charting debut on the US Billboard 200, launching at No. 7 with 62,000 equivalent album units sold in its first week, concurrently becoming the duo's first No. 1 entry on Billboard's Christian Albums chart.

Burn the Ships garnered critical acclaim for their creativity, songwriting and the Smallbone brothers' vocal style. At the 2020 Grammy Awards, the album won the Best Contemporary Christian Music Album, while a remixed version of "God Only Knows" which features vocals from Dolly Parton won Best Contemporary Christian Music Performance/Song.

Background
In February 2017, the duo announced that they had begun work on their third studio album in Los Angeles. The album was a follow-up to For King & Country's commercially successful, critically acclaimed sophomore effort, Run Wild. Live Free. Love Strong. released in 2014. In the four years between the releases, the Smallbone brothers worked on and released the film Priceless and the film's soundtrack in 2016, which, according to Luke Smallbone in the pair's interview with Billboard, held them back from returning to the studio. The duo also headlined the 2016 Winter Jam Tour Spectacular and had their song, "Ceasefire" featured as a music video for the 2016 film, Ben-Hur and also featured on the soundtrack to the 2017 film, The Shack, with a cover of "Amazing Grace". Skillet and the duo joined forces for the joy.UNLEASHED  The Tour which ran from mid-April through early May. When the tour concluded, the duo announced that they will release "Joy." as the first single from the album on 18 May 2018. For King & Country then released "Joy.", that day.

Joel Smallbone shared with his opinion with Billboard about the album:
It feels like the most mature record that we've made just in understanding who we are as a duo, who we are as men and maybe understanding life because we are a bit older than we were last time around,

— Joel Smallbone, Billboard

Luke Smallbone also shared with Billboard that they established, through their assessment of Run Wild. Live Free. Love Strong., that the songs which connected with their listeners the most are the ones that were personal, and set out to ensure that every song on the album would have a personal story attached to it. Joel also explained to People that "The album was built around this concept of 'where are we' socially, politically [and] as a nation."

The name of the album, as well as the title track, stems from a battle that Luke Smallbone's wife, Courtney, faced with an addiction to prescribed medication, coupled with an historical incident during the Spanish conquest of Mexico in 1519 AD, where a Spanish commander named Hernán Cortés, landed his ships on enemy shores unaware of what awaited his arrival. To ensure that the men were committed to their mission, he proclaimed, "Burn the ships!" Joel Smallbone expressed to Lee Clarion that Burn the Ships was "very much dedicated to the whole concept of no retreat, to very aggressively leave the past in the past and move forward."

Music and lyrics
According to Timothy Monger of AllMusic, the music on the album, mixes the duo's "signature blend of dynamic rock and electronic pop with classical and choral elements." NewReleaseToday's Kevin Davis likened the "worshipful alt-rock style" to recent releases by Coldplay, Needtobreathe and Mat Kearney, declaring that the "entire project has a Brit-rock tinged worshipful vibe," while noting that it "doesn't conform to the pattern of typical CCM music." Robert Berman from Worship Musician Magazine described the album as being "in the same, hooky, Imagine Dragons/OneRepublic vein as their previous work, loaded with atmospheric keyboards in soaring arrangements." The album's lyrics explore the themes of "hope, forgiveness, faith, and new beginnings," whilst being "catchy and biblical." Brandon Callies from On Tour Monthly depicted the album as "an anthem filled offering from start to finish," with "a constant uplift from track to track," musically and lyrically.

The album opens with "Introit", is an instrumental intro. This is followed by "Joy", which is a "bursting, celebratory anthem" with an "upbeat hook and infectious melody". Described by Billboard as "a buoyant track backed by a 100-member choir" features a refrain from the popular song "Joy in My Heart" by George William Cooke. "God Only Knows" is an "emotional track full of hope," that tackles depression and suicide, which could "easily be paired with Imagine Dragons or Fun any day." The music video of "God Only Knows" ends with the number for the National Suicide Prevention Line. "Amen" is another song that also asserts the brothers' religious convictions, inspired by Luke Smallbone's rebaptism, that provides "a Latin flair and energy into the mix." The album's namesake track conveys the message of no retreat and leaving the past behind. "Burn the Ships" has been likened to the 1994 Steven Curtis Chapman song of the same name due to the inspiration drawn from the historical incident. "Fight On, Fighter" is a song dedicated to their wives, a follow-up to "Priceless". "Need You More" was born out of Luke's son's near-death experience, which leans sonically towards "more of a traditional praise and worship sound." "Control" is a song about letting go and letting God take the lead in life. "Never Give Up" which uses "a relaxed groove with soft beats and finger snapping" encouraging the listener to do just that. The penultimate song, "Hold Her" is a love song about the difficulties of being away from home, dramatising "the relational separations caused by a traveling musician’s life on the road." The duo joins forces with their wives on the final track, "Pioneers", forming "an ABBA-esque quartet," to encourage married couples to carry on through the troubles they face.

Artwork
The album cover image for Burn the Ships was shot in Iceland, serving as a "picturesque version of what it means to carry on within a seemingly desolate and volcanic framework."

Release and promotion
On 13 May 2018, the duo announced that "Joy" will be released on 18 May and the song was availed for pre-order on iTunes and pre-saving on Spotify, with Spotify users being entered into a contest where the winner gets a trip to Nashville to attend an album listening party with the duo in the studio. The lead single "Joy" was released that day, with the song's accompanying music video exclusively released to Apple Music. The music video for "Joy" was released to YouTube two days later. In an interview with Billboard, the duo was questioned regarding the album's release date and its title given that some promotional materials suggested a May release, to which Luke Smallbone replied that the album will most likely come out in October. On 29 June 2018, For King & Country announced that their third studio album will be titled Burn the Ships, slated for release on 5 October 2018, with the album's pre-order period starting that day, as well as the availing of "Pioneers" featuring Moriah Peters and Courtney Smallbone (credited by their first names) as a promotional single from the album, as well as its accompanying music video. The duo also announced that it would avail a new song once a month in the lead-up to the album's release.

"God Only Knows" followed as the third promotional single from the album on 27 July 2018, the duo also releasing the song's music video. On 3 August 2018, For King & Country performed live on FOX & Friends. They went on to avail "Amen" as the fourth promotional single from the album during the pre-order period, as releasing the music video of the song. The album's title track, "Burn the Ships", was the fifth and final instant grat track from the album on 28 September 2018. The entire eleven-song collection was released on 5 October 2018, and the duo celebrated the album's release with the unveiling of the music video for "Burn the Ships".

Singles
"Joy" was released on 18 May 2018 as the album's lead single. On 11 January 2019, "God Only Knows" was released to Christian radio becoming the second single from the album. "Burn the Ships" impacted Christian radio on 30 August 2019, as the album's third single.

Tours
For King & Country announced the Burn the Ships  Album Release Tour, presented by AEG, to support the album in August 2018. The tour ran from 2 October to 27 October 2018 with For King & Country performing in a dozen shows across the United States, commencing the tour at the Shubert Theatre in Boston, Massachusetts, and ending the tour at the Moore Theatre in Seattle, Washington.

In November 2018, For King & Country announced that they will be embarking on the Burn the Ships  World Tour 2019, also in support of the album, with Josh Baldwin set to perform on select dates. The tour launched on 26 January 2018 at the La Vida Centre in Christchurch, New Zealand and concluded at the Julie Rogers Theatre in Beaumont, Texas, with stops in cities across Australia, New Zealand, Singapore, the Philippines and the United States. In December 2019, the band announced a new  Canadian leg of the tour, with stops in eight cities, which will begin at the TD Place Arena in Ottawa on 12 March 2020 and end at the Orpheum in Vancouver on 24 March 2020. This leg was suspended, then cancelled after COVID-19 pandemic in Canada set in after the show at the Meridian Hall in Toronto on 13 March.

Critical reception

Burn the Ships prompted largely positive reactions, echoed in reviews about the collection from critics within the Contemporary Christian music genre. 
Joshua Andre rated the album four and a half out-of five at 365 Days of Inspiring Media, stating that Burn the Ships, though "captivating and powerful," was not as compelling as Run Wild. Live Free. Love Strong. AllMusic's Timothy Monger used "powerful" and "ambitious" as descriptors of the album. Reviewing for CCM Magazine, Jen Rose Yokel said of Burn the Ships: "with its epic soundscapes and energetic, hopeful songwriting, it's a pop album you won't want to miss." The Christian Beat contributor Emily Caroline wrote that "Burn the Ships is definitely a release to look forward to. The Smallbone brothers have a lot to share with this album, using their smooth, warm, relatable vocals and relatable songwriting to touch many." Bestowing a perfect ten square rating for Cross Rhythms, Tony Cummings concludes simply: "An absolute gem of an album."
In a somewhat negative review from Jesus Freak Hideout, Michael Weaver rated the collection two stars, says "Burn the Ships isn't necessarily "safe," but it isn't as aspiring as their earlier work. However, the album has some very bright moments and some more poignant ones as well." Wayne Myatt gave a more favourable second opinion in a Jesus Freak Hideout review, acknowledging "They [For King & Country] have toned things down a bit on this release," as the band enters a new chapter in life but recommended to the duo's fans and "perhaps those who favor the lighter side of pop and rock music." The album came under scrutiny from an additional two cents piece by Jesus Freak Hideout's Alex Caldwell, describing the collection as "the tale of two albums," calling the first six tracks "being creative, energetic and compelling" yet the remainder are "b-sides that shouldn't have made the record." Christopher Smith was more optimistic in his Jesus Freak Hideout additional two cents piece, saying that the duo have crafted "their most cohesive album yet," deeming it "a highlight pop release of 2018." In a NewReleaseToday review, Kevin Davis believes "The album once again demonstrates multi-talented musicianship with creative, insightful lyrics and ear-grabbing melodies." Brandon Callies, in a positive On Tour Monthly review, optimistically expressed that the collection will impress the Christian pop fanbase, whilst asserting that the songs "really push the boundaries of what contemporary Christian music generally has to offer. There is certainly more mainstream appeal." Robert Berman lauded the album in his review at Worship Musician Magazine, declaring that Burn the Ships "deserves a listen from all fans of hopeful, faithful pop." Abby Baracksai specified in a perfect five-out-of-five rating track-by-track review for Today's Christian Entertainment, that the album is "absolutely fantastic. The music is wonderful and the lyrics are impactful." Today's Christian Entertainment, along with NewReleaseToday and CCM Magazine declared that the album is one of the best/top Christian records of 2018.

Accolades

Commercial performance
In the United States, Burn the Ships debuted at No. 7 on the mainstream Billboard 200 chart dated 20 October 2018, earning a career-best of 62,000 equivalent album units in sales in its first week. The album concurrently debuted at No. 1 on Billboard's Christian Albums chart that same week, was also the sixth best-selling digital release in the country that same week. The album was a milestone for the duo, as it was their first top 10 entry on the Billboard 200 chart, their first Christian Albums chart-topper and fifth top 10 on the Christian Albums chart. For King & Country also made their inaugural appearance with Burn the Ships on the all-genre Canadian Albums Chart issued by Billboard at No. 41.

In Australia, Burn the Ships debuted at No. 11 on the ARIA Digital Album Chart for the week commencing 15 October 2018. Burn the Ships launched at No. 3 on the Official Christian & Gospel Albums Chart dated 12–18 October 2018, as published by the Official Charts Company in the United Kingdom.

Track listing

Sample credits
 "Joy." contains an interpolation of the song, "Joy in My Heart" written by George William Cooke

Personnel
Adapted from AllMusic.

 Benjamin Backus – arranger, background vocals, cello, dulcimer, editing, engineer, horn, piano, programming, string arrangements, strings
 Josh Bailey – a&r
 Teddy Boldt – drums
 Mark Campbell – arranger, background vocals, editing, engineer, guitar, programming
 Courtney – featured artist
 Bethany Cruz – choir/chorus, vocals
 John Denosky – editing, engineer
 Jason Dering – editing, engineer
 Vince DiCarlo – acoustic guitar, background vocals, bass guitar, cello, horn
 For King & Country – arranger, primary artist, producer, programming
 Serban Ghenea – mixing
 Ainslie Grosser – editing, engineer, mixing
 Josh Gudwin – mixing
 Matt Hales – arranger, editing, engineer, producer, programming
 Jake Halm – arranger, background vocals, editing, engineer, mixing, programming, string arrangements, strings
 David Henry – cello, string arrangements, strings, viola, violin
 Hunter Jackson – mixing assistant
 Timmy Jones – drums
 Blake Kanicka – arranger, bass guitar, producer, engineer, programming
 Josh Kerr – arranger, programming
 Darren King – drums
 Joe LaPorta – mastering
 Carl Marsh – string arrangements, strings
 Julie Melucci – bass guitar, guitar
 Seth Mosley – arranger, producer
 Blair Munday – art direction
 Mike "X." O'Connor – editing, engineer
 Moriah Peters – featured artist, vocals
 Jordan Reynolds – arranger, programming
 Jonathan Richter – illustrations
 Mitchell Schleper – design, layout, photography
 Jerricho Scroggins – editing, engineer
 David Smallbone – production advisor
 Joel Smallbone – editing, engineer, piano
 Luke Smallbone – drums
 Jeff Sojka – editing, engineer, mixing
 Dan Stilling – photography
 Tedd Tjornhom – arranger, mixing, producer, programming

Charts

Weekly charts

Year-end charts

Decade-end charts

Certifications

Release history

References

2018 albums
Albums produced by Aqualung (musician)
For King & Country (band) albums